David Merwin Smith (December 17, 1914 – April 1, 1998) was a Major League Baseball pitcher who played in  and  with the Philadelphia Athletics. He batted and threw right-handed.

External links

1914 births
1998 deaths
Major League Baseball pitchers
Baseball players from South Carolina
Philadelphia Athletics players
Duke Blue Devils baseball players